Freeman Gill (September 5, 1851 – April 8, 1905) was a Gunner's Mate first class serving in the United States Navy during the Spanish–American War who received the Medal of Honor for bravery.

Biography

Medal of Honor citation
Rank and organization: Gunner's Mate First Class, U.S. Navy. Born: 5 September 1851, Boston, Mass. Accredited to: Massachusetts. G.O. No.: 55, 19 July 1901.

Citation:

On board the U.S.S. Marblehead during the operation of cutting the cable leading from Cienfuegos, Cuba, 11 May 1898. Facing the heavy fire of the enemy, Gill set an example of extraordinary bravery and coolness throughout this action.

See also

List of Medal of Honor recipients for the Spanish–American War

References

External links

1851 births
1905 deaths
United States Navy Medal of Honor recipients
United States Navy sailors
American military personnel of the Spanish–American War
People from Boston
Spanish–American War recipients of the Medal of Honor